Uzbekistan is scheduled to compete at the 2017 World Aquatics Championships in Budapest, Hungary from 14 July to 30 July.

Diving

Uzbekistan has entered 3 divers (two male and one female).

Swimming

Uzbek swimmers have achieved qualifying standards in the following events (up to a maximum of 2 swimmers in each event at the A-standard entry time, and 1 at the B-standard):

Synchronized swimming

Uzbekistan's synchronized swimming team consisted of 10 athletes (10 female).

Women

 Legend: (R) = Reserve Athlete

References

Nations at the 2017 World Aquatics Championships
Uzbekistan at the World Aquatics Championships
2017 in Uzbekistani sport